Love Bomb is the seventh studio album by The Tubes, and their second to be produced by Todd Rundgren. It was released in 1985 on Capitol Records. It is the last major-label release by The Tubes.

Following the release of Love Bomb, the band broke up, with drummer Prairie Prince and keyboardist Vince Welnick joining Rundgren's touring band. Rundgren would also record his own version of "Feel It" for his 1989 album Nearly Human, which also featured the two musicians.

Track listing
"Piece by Piece" - 4:25
"Stella" - 4:12
"Come as You Are" - 3:41
"One Good Reason" - 4:06
"Bora Bora 2000/Love Bomb" - 4:31
"Night People" - 2:24
"Say Hey" - 2:28
"Eyes" - 3:48
"Muscle Girls" - 0:56
"Theme from a Wooly Place" (Wooly Bully/Theme from A Summer Place) - 0:46
"For a Song" - 3:16
"Say Hey (Part 2)" - 0:35
"Feel It" - 4:08
"Night People (Reprise)" - 1:22

Charts

References

The Tubes albums
1985 albums
Albums produced by Todd Rundgren
Capitol Records albums